The 1980 UCI Road World Championships took place from 30-31 August 1980 in Sallanches, France. Only two races took place because of the Moscow Olympics. It was one of the toughest World Championship courses ever, featuring nearly 6000m of climbing over 20 laps of a 13 km course.

Results

Medal table

External links 

 Men's results
 Women's results
  Results at sportpro.it

 
UCI Road World Championships by year
UCI Road World Championships 1980
UCI Road World Championships
Uci Road World Championships, 1980
UCI Road World Championships